The Esmond Methodist Episcopal Church and Township Hall are two historic buildings at the junction of Center Street and Elm Street in Esmond, South Dakota.  They were added to the National Register of Historic Places in 2006.

The church was built in 1885 and was expanded in 1927.  The Township Hall was built in 1893.

By 2006, the town had disappeared, except for two houses and these two buildings.

References

Methodist churches in South Dakota
Churches on the National Register of Historic Places in South Dakota
Victorian architecture in South Dakota
Churches completed in 1885
Churches in Kingsbury County, South Dakota
National Register of Historic Places in Kingsbury County, South Dakota